The 1934 Liechtenstein Football Championship was the first  as all Liechtenstein clubs were not only members of the Swiss FA but also of the cantonal Sankt Gallen federation, who had placed all Liechtenstein club in one regional group, whose winners were declared champions of Liechtenstein. The 1937 edition had only one participant (FC Triesen), so the championship was awarded without any matches being played. No further editions were played (but the Liechtenstein Football Cup started after World War II).

List of Champions:
 1934: FC Triesen 
 1935: FC Triesen
 1936: FC Vaduz
 1937: FC Triesen

Winners: (4) 
 3 FC Triesen (1934, 1935, 1937)
 1 FC Vaduz (1936)

References

1936 in Liechtenstein
1936 in association football
Defunct football competitions in Liechtenstein